Aphisara Suwanchonrathi (born 29 March 2007) is a Thai cricketer. She was a part of Thai team in 2022 Women's Asia Cup and made her T20I debut against Pakistan.

References

External links
 
 

2007 births
Living people
Aphisara Suwanchonrathi
Aphisara Suwanchonrathi